Dogger may refer to:
 Dogger Bank, a large shallow area in the North Sea between Britain and Denmark
 Dogger Bank incident, the Russian attack on British fishermen in 1904 at the Dogger Bank area in the North Sea.
 Dogger (boat), a type of ketch rigged fishing boat working the Dogger Bank in the seventeenth century
 Dogger (book), a book by Shirley Hughes
 Dogger, a person who engages in the sexual practice of dogging
 Dogger, a sea area in the North Sea, noted in shipping forecasts
 The Dogger, rocks of the Middle Jurassic epoch
 Doggers, people who hunted and trapped dingoes

People 
 Paul Dogger (1971), a former professional tennis player from the Netherlands

See also 
 Doggo, an internet slang term for "dogs' language"
  Battle of Dogger Bank, disambiguation page listing various battles and confrontations at or near the Dogger Bank.
 Dog (disambiguation)
 Dogging (disambiguation)